The River Bush (from the ) is a river in County Antrim, Northern Ireland. The river's source is in the Antrim Hills at 480m. From there the river flows northwest, with a bend at the town of Armoy. It then flows west, passing through Stranocum, and then bends north, passing through Bushmills before reaching the sea at Portballintrae on the North Antrim coast. It flows through a fertile valley devoted to grassland-based agriculture with limited arable cropping. The underlying geology is basalt and the water is slightly alkaline with magnesium making an unusually large contribution to total hardness. The river supports indigenous stocks of Atlantic salmon and brown trout. Saint Columb's Rill, which is a tributary of the river, is the source of water used for distilling Bushmills whiskey.

Angling
The River Bush has traditionally been a salmon-fishing river, though the numbers dwindled in the late 20th and early 21st century. The River Bush still offers excellent salmon fishing. It is managed as a premier salmon river by Department of Culture, Arts and Leisure (DCAL), Inland Fisheries Division.

See also
List of rivers of Northern Ireland
Rivers of Ireland

References

External links

Rivers of County Antrim